Sei Pakning Airport or Sei Selari Airport  is a domestic airport located in Sungai Pakning, Bengkalis Regency, Riau Province, Indonesia. It serves the town of Sungai Pakning. The airport was served charter flights for Pertamina. Currently, there are no flights to and from this airport.

References

 The Report: Indonesia, 2012
 Fairplay World Ports Directory. p. 405.

Airports in Riau